Dolichandra is a genus of flowering plants in the family Bignoniaceae, native to Latin America and the Caribbean. They are climbing lianas with trifid and uncate tendrils. The best-known species is Dolichandra unguis-cati.

Species
Currently accepted species include:

Dolichandra chodatii (Hassl.) L.G.Lohmann
Dolichandra cynanchoides Cham.
Dolichandra dentata (K.Schum.) L.G.Lohmann
Dolichandra hispida (DC.) L.H.Fonseca & L.G.Lohmann
Dolichandra quadrivalvis (Jacq.) L.G.Lohmann
Dolichandra steyermarkii (Sandwith) L.G.Lohmann
Dolichandra uncata (Andrews) L.G.Lohmann
Dolichandra unguiculata (Vell.) L.G.Lohmann
Dolichandra unguis-cati (L.) L.G.Lohmann

References

Bignoniaceae
Bignoniaceae genera